A Pirzada is historically described as official custodians of Sufi mausoleums and shrines in Muslim lands, with their earliest mentions being in Baghdad, Iraq, during the period of the Umayyad caliphate. Often a Pirzada was a descendant of those buried within the tomb they were assigned to, hence most of the Pirzadas are successor to Saint buried in the tomb.

It also serves as surname for their ascendants in many Indo-Aryan cultures and their accompanying languages, with Pirzada translating into "the son of a saint" in Persian. Today, predominantly-Muslim families bearing the name can be found in various regions around the world, including Turkey, Bangladesh, Iran, Afghanistan, Pakistan, Kashmir and the northern regions of India. Much of their lineage can be traced to the central Asian plateaus, consisting of the Soviet Union's former republics, such as Ukraine, Armenia, Azerbaijan, Turkmenistan, Chechnya, Kyrgyzstan, Turkmenistan, and Tajikistan. Much of the modern-day Pirzada diaspora derives from the mass migration of the community from Central Asia towards several different areas immediately at a date that is estimated to be sometime during the 15th century.

Diaspora

Pirzadas of Turkey
The origins of Pirzadas as they lay in Central Asia also translated into their presence in the realms of the former Ottoman Empire. As late as 1710, Ottoman census records indicate Pirzadas residing in Turkish municipalities such Istanbul, Denizli, Bursa, and Tokat, with their professions revolving around textiles, finance, and military service. Cüneyt Pirzada held the rank of Binbaşı, or Major, in the Kapıkulu Süvarileri, or Six Divisions of Cavalry of the Ottoman Empire, as per records from 1741. The Pirzadas of Turkey also practiced carpet-weaving in much the same fashion as their counterparts in the Indian subcontinent, with Ottoman tax receipts displaying a thriving artisan practice in Tokat as late as 1874.

Pirzadas of Iran
Pirzadas were first recorded in modern-day Persia during the rule of the Qajar dynasty, which ruled Iran from 1785 to 1925. Census records indicate their first presence being in the village of Urmia, close to the border with Azerbaijan, in the year 1783, although they had been a mainstay in the region for close to a century prior. Originally a farming community, Pirzadas eventually began to emerge as an astute family of financial bankers in the cities of Tehran and Qom, with tax records indicating their roles as facilitators of mercantile trade and credit among officials of the Qajar dynasty and foreigners wishing to ship their wares to Persia. Some Pirzadas eventually harnessed their financial backgrounds for the purpose of the Qajar themselves, with an upwards of six generations of the family serving as civil servants and bureaucrats for the government till the last-recorded instance of 1911. In addition, Pirzadas combined their expertise in textiles and finance in order to benefit from Isfahan's status as the artisan hub of Islamic crafts and goods, as the family not only wove, but handled the business behind their own autonomous carpeting businesses.

Pirzadas of Afghanistan
The Pirzadas of Afghanistan were relatively few in number: the community never expanded beyond a few dozen patrons of a single family, although a minority of them are found in the city of Ghazni Afghanistan.

Pirzadas of Bangladesh
The Pirzadas in Bangladesh are a diverse group, descending from various different Sufi pirs. The Pirzada is considered to be the one who is nominated by the Sufi to the gaddi nasheen. Among the notable historic personalities who were known by the title of Pirzada are Pirzada Muhammad Ahmadullah, a Sufi saint of Rajshahi, and the Pirzada of Sylhet who lead the Muharram Rebellion in 1782.

Pirzadas of India
The earliest recorded instance of the surname lays in a Mughal court official named Nur-ud-din Pirzada, who served at the Serai Nurmahal in the city of Nurmahal in Punjab, in 1693. By the time the Indian subcontinent was fully under control of the British Empire, Ehsan Pirzada ran a carpet-weaving guild in Amritsar that wove rugs for use by members of the British Royal Family, and Anglo aristocrats that resided in the British Raj, such as Sir John Lawrence, the first British governor of the Punjab province, United India.

Pirzadas of Kashmir
The origins of Pirzadas of Kashmir can be traced back to Middle East. Most of the Pirzada/Peerzadas of Kashmir moved from Iran to the Himalayas to spread religious preachings. The roots of Pirzadas in Kashmir is Syed.

Demographics

Religion
Pirzadas are affiliated with sayeds or Pirs family, although there does exist a diversity in regards to the sects and subdivisions of the faith. Pirzadas found in 70% Sunni Muslims around the world, Pakistan and Northern India sympathize with the Sunni branch of Islam, while there exists a small minority of them within them who actively profess faith in the Aga Khan and subsequently the practices of the 30% Shia Muslim.

Ethnicity
At their core, every individual belonging to the Pirzada family comes from an Hashmi bloodline originating in Mekkah. They originally belong to the Banu Hashim tribe of Prophet Muhammad, which is predominately found in Saudi Arabia. They are descendants of Muslim Bin Aqeel (the first martyr of karbala in kofa). They are found in the footprints of mass migration from Saudi Arabia after the tragedy of Karbala to countries in the Soviet Union, Iran, Turkey Afghanistan, sub-continent, etc.

List of notable Pirzadas
Sharifuddin Pirzada, Secretary General Organization of the Islamic Conference from 1985 to 1988
Moeed Pirzada, Pakistani journalist
Rabi Peerzada, Pakistani actress

References

Social groups of Pakistan
Military of the Ottoman Empire
Social groups of India
Sufism